Vol-au-vent is a 1996 British comedy film directed by John McKenzie and starring Dennis Waterman, Julia McKenzie, and Lisa Coleman. Its plot concerns an upper-middle class wedding that is interrupted by three jewel thieves on the run from the law.

Cast
 Dennis Waterman ...  Pete / Kevin
 Julia McKenzie ...  Audrey
 Lisa Coleman ...  Christine
 Joanne Engelsman ...  Samantha
 Joanna Wyatt ...  Allison
 John Hug ...  Mark
 Brian Mitchell ...  Dave / De Alan
 Nick Bayly ...  Smokes / Alan
 Tim Mills ...  Paul
 Robert Ashby ...  Toby
 Victoria Burnham ...  Tracy
 Peter Mair ...  Ernest
 Bruce Douglas ...  Policeman
 David Credell ...  DS Ellis
 Peter Coles ...  Church Usher

References

External links

 English hard-of-hearing DVD subtitles

1996 films
1996 comedy films
1990s English-language films
British comedy films
1990s British films